Edgefest is an annual concert held in Little Rock, Arkansas, United States. It is produced by 100.3 The Edge radio station.

2006 Edgefest I 
July 7 North Shore Riverwalk - 7,500 in attendance

Rob Zombie, Anthrax, Shinedown, Trapt, Evans Blue, Halestorm

2007 Edgefest II 
June 12 North Shore Riverwalk - 10,000 in attendance

Godsmack, Three Days Grace, Breaking Benjamin, Puddle of Mudd, Red, Sevendust, Skillet

2008 Edgefest III 
April 26 East Shore Riverwalk - 15,000 in attendance

Kid Rock, Disturbed, Saliva, Sevendust, Five Finger Death Punch, Black Stone Cherry

2009 Edgefest IV (Mudfest) 
May 9 Cooper Farm - 12,500 in attendance

Slipknot, Staind, Chevelle, Drowning Pool, All That Remains, Hurt, Dirtfedd

2009 Edgefest V: The Redemption 
August 15, 2009 Arkansas State Fairgrounds - 9,000 in attendance.  Tickets that were not used at the Edge-Mudfest were honored at this show.

Edgefest 5: The Redemption took place on August 15, 2009 because at the previous Edgefest, many ticket buyers could not get into the show because of rainy and muddy conditions. The Edge put together a second show in 2009 by bringing Mudvayne's Pedal to the Metal tour to Little Rock with the addition of headliners Korn on their Escape from the Studio tour.

Korn, Mudvayne, Black Label Society, Static-X, Suicide Silence, Bury Your Dead, Since October, Burn Halo, Wasting Days, Wishtribe, Dark from Day One, Bombay Black

Also featuring various surprise performances by the SideShow phenomenon HellzaPoppin.

2010 Edgefest VI 
May 8, 2010 Arkansas State Fairgrounds - 19,000+ in attendance.

Godsmack, Rob Zombie featuring Joey Jordison, Seether, Papa Roach, Hellyeah, Five Finger Death Punch, Bullet for My Valentine, Drowning Pool, Lacuna Coil, The Veer Union, Shaman's Harvest, Dark from Day One, The Vail, The Coup de Grace

2011 Edgefest VII 

April 23, 2011
Arkansas State Fairgrounds - 20,000+

Avenged Sevenfold, Stone Sour, Three Days Grace, Seether, Theory of a Deadman, Skillet, Sevendust, Helmet, Halestorm, My Darkest Days, Art of Dying, Dark from Day One

2012 Edgefest VIII 

August 18, 2012 Arkansas State Fairgrounds 

Shinedown, Godsmack, Papa Roach, Staind, Adelitas Way, P.O.D, Deuce, Redlight King, In This Moment, Fozzy, Candlelight Red, Mindset Evolution

External links 
 Official website

Rock festivals in the United States
Culture of Little Rock, Arkansas
2006 establishments in Arkansas